Father Bernard Kinvi is a Roman Catholic priest, a monk of the Order of Saint Camillus. He is the head of a  Catholic mission in Bossemptele in Central African Republic. He was awarded the Alison Des Forges Award for Extraordinary Activism by Human Rights Watch for protecting Muslim refugees in his church.

References

Living people
Year of birth missing (living people)
Central African Republic Roman Catholic priests